Volkan Akyıldız (born 23 February 1995) is an Austrian footballer.

Career

At the end of 2014/15, Akyildiz left Turkey so he would not have to serve in the Turkish military, eventually paying money to avoid conscription.

For 2015/16, he signed for Au-Berneck in the Swiss sixth division where he scored 37 goals in 23 appearances, including six in one game.

In 2017, Akyildiz signed for Austrian Bundesliga club SC Rheindorf Altach, scoring 33 goals in 22 league appearances for their reserves in the third division. However, he failed to establish himself in the first team and left for the Turkish fourth division after two spells in the Austrian second league.

In 2020, Akyildiz said that European teams emphasize discipline whereas Turkish teams rely on physical strength.

References

External links
 Volkan Akyıldız at Soccerway
 

Living people
1995 births
People from Hohenems
Austrian footballers
Austrian people of Turkish descent
Association football forwards
Ofspor footballers
SC Rheindorf Altach players
SK Austria Klagenfurt players
SC Wiener Neustadt players
Nazilli Belediyespor footballers
Orduspor footballers
Footballers from Vorarlberg